Euroregion Cieszyn Silesia is one of the euroregions (transnational co-operation structures) between Poland and Czech Republic. It has area of 1741,34 km² and 658,224 inhabitants as of 2009. The largest cities are Jastrzębie Zdrój from Polish side and Havířov from Czech side. It was established on 22 April 1998.

It comprises a large part of the historical region of Cieszyn Silesia:
 in Poland: 12 municipalities of the Cieszyn County, 2 municipalities of the Bielsko County (Jaworze and Jasienica), 1 municipality in Wodzisław County (Godów) and Jastrzębie Zdrój (however, the last two are not part of Cieszyn Silesia).
 in the Czech Republic: 16 municipalities of the Karviná District and 27 municipalities in the eastern part of the Frýdek-Místek District;

Not the whole area of the historical Cieszyn Silesia region belongs to the euroregion, mainly Bielsko and Czechowice-Dziedzice and Frýdek with its surroundings, east of the Ostravice river, which belong to the Euroregion Beskydy.

Strategic goals of Euroregion 
 wide development of the region
 exchange of experience and information
 support for culture, education and sport in the region
 development of regional transport infrastructure
 improvement of the security of citizens
 tourism development
 cooperation between schools and support for ecological initiatives

See also 
 Olza (river)
 Czantoria Wielka
 Godów, Silesian Voivodeship

References

External links 

 Official homepage
 Euregio-teschinensis

Euroregions of Poland
Geography of the Czech Republic
Cieszyn Silesia